Saint-Michel de Ouenzé is a Congolese football club based in Brazzaville.

Honours
 Congo Premier League: 2
2003, 2010

Performance in CAF competitions
 CAF Champions League: 2 appearances
2004: First Round
2011: Preliminary Round

References

Football clubs in the Republic of the Congo
Sports clubs in Brazzaville